Kapitan Andreevo is a village near the Bulgaria—Turkey—Greece tripoint in Svilengrad municipality, Haskovo Province, southern Bulgaria. As of 2005 it has 948 inhabitants and the mayor is Dimitar Shiderov. Due to the proximity with Turkey, there is a major border checkpoint built there, with the Turkish side of the checkpoint being called Kapıkule. The busy Bulgaria–Turkey border crossing at Kapitan Andreevo is an important point of entrance to the European Union.

The checkpoint, one of the busiest in the European Union, has been notorious as an entry point for drugs into the EU, and has long been reported to be run by organized crime. It is part of a wider Bulgarian problem of border corruption, which has hindered Bulgaria's accession into the Schengen area.

References

Villages in Haskovo Province
Bulgaria–Turkey border crossings